Canton Avenue is a street in Pittsburgh's Beechview neighborhood which is the steepest officially recorded public street in the United States.

The Guinness Book of World Records says Baldwin Street, in Dunedin, New Zealand, is the world's steepest street with a gradient of 34.8%. This record is disputed; Pittsburgh news and international media have claimed Canton Avenue is the steepest street in the world. The United States record is also disputed, as Bradford Street in San Francisco includes a 39% grade nine meters long and Waipio Valley Road has sections as steep as a 45% grade. 

The National Map says the steep 213 feet of Canton Avenue averages less than 30%. The map's elevations can be off by a foot or two; probably Pennsylvania's LIDAR surveys done in the last few years can do better. Google Earth says the street averages 29% for 212 feet.

In March 2016 Canton Avenue was the subject of a commercial, featuring freeskier Bene Mayr, snowboarder Heikki Sorsa, downhill mountain biker Aaron Gwin, and racing driver Mattias Ekström for the Audi Quattro A4 automobile.

See also 
 Dirty Dozen (bicycle competition)

References

External links

 Canton Ave on OpenStreetMap
 Canton Ave on Google Maps
 Video of Canton Ave on YouTube

Streets in Pittsburgh